Austrasiatica hirasei is a species of sea snail, a cowry, a marine gastropod mollusc in the family Cypraeidae, the cowries. It was first described by as Cypraea hirasei by S. Raymond Roberts, in 1913. from a specimen found at Tanabe, on the Kii Coast in Japan.

Description

Distribution
Range: East China Sea, Japan, Philippines, Fiji, Australia

References

Cypraeidae
Gastropods described in 1913